Norman Karl Sanders (born 15 October 1932) is an Australian former politician, representing the Australian Democrats in the Tasmanian House of Assembly from 1980 to 1982 and the Australian Senate from 1985 to 1990.

Early life
Born in Cleveland, Sanders served in the United States Air Force from 1950 to 1952.  He worked as an Alaskan bush pilot and later, an aerospace engineer.  He completed a Bachelor of Science degree at the University of Alaska, and Master of Arts at the University of California, Los Angeles. Having obtained a  Fulbright Scholarship to study in Australia, he was awarded his doctorate at the University of Tasmania in 1968.

Upon returning to the United States, Sanders took up the role of assistant professor of geography at the University of California, Santa Barbara.  He was very active in the battle to stop offshore oil drilling, was on the board of directors of GET OIL OUT! (GOO!) and a founding director of Western Citizens for Environmental Defense, which conducted environmental legal actions.  He was a member of the International Council of Environmental Law, Bonn, Germany.  He was also deeply involved in the campaign to pass Proposition 20, the California Coastal Initiative.  Sanders sailed across the Pacific to Tasmania in 1974.  On the voyage, he and his crew became witnesses in the Palmyra murders described by Vincent Bugliosi in his book And the Sea Will Tell.

While still in Hobart, Sanders worked as a TV journalist on the ABC current-affairs program This Day Tonight. This was the prelude to his becoming heavily involved in Australia's nascent environmental movement, and to his directorship of  the Tasmanian Wilderness Society. He published two books on environmental issues.

Political career
A decision by the Tasmanian Labor government (then led by Premier Harry Holgate) to dam the Franklin River led Sanders to become a leader of the movement to oppose the proposed dam. Representing the Australian Democrats (then still a new party), he was elected to the Tasmanian House of Assembly as the Member for Denison at a 1980 by-election. This success made him Australia's first parliamentarian ever to be elected on a specifically environmental platform. In parliament, Sanders was a key player in the campaign to save the Franklin River, and successfully moved a motion of no confidence in the Holgate administration during March 1982. This forced an early state election, which Holgate lost.

During the early 1980s, Sanders lobbied to bring in water bombers to fight Tasmanian bushfires.  Although he was unsuccessful (the idea was dismissed as unsuitable for "Australian conditions"), many years later this became standard practice in Australia, as it had already become in America.

On 23 December 1982, Sanders resigned from the Tasmanian Parliament. He claimed that the new government, led by the Liberals' Robin Gray, was becoming totalitarian in nature over the Franklin Dam issue and, in particular, over the way in which anti-dam protesters were being treated by the state's law enforcement sector.

Sanders spent the next few years as a small businessman, selling an ecologically sound, efficient wood heater of his own design called the "Sanders Hot Prospect Stove" from the back of a truck at the Salamanca Market. He then turned his attention to federal politics and was elected as a Democrats senator at the 1984 election on an environmental platform, his term commencing on 1 July 1985. He was the only person to represent the Australian Democrats in both a state parliament and the Federal Parliament.

He was a member of an Australian parliamentary delegation to the Soviet Union where he had talks with Andrei Gromyko about nuclear disarmament. The delegation then proceeded to Poland to meet with General Wojciech Jaruzelski. He also was on delegations to NATO, Finland, Norway, Uzbekistan, the European Parliament, France, Belgium, and China.  He was re-elected at the 1987 election but resigned from the Senate on 1 March 1990 to contest a Senate position in the Australian Capital Territory at the 1990 federal election. He was unsuccessful.

Following his defeat, Sanders lectured in Human Ecology at the Australian National University.  He unsuccessfully contested the House of Representatives seat of Eden-Monaro (NSW) for the Democrats at the 1993 federal election.

Life post-politics
Sanders is an experienced mountaineer and skier. In 1954 he was a member of the twelfth party to climb Mount McKinley, and climbed a number of other high peaks in Alaska and Canada. He was on the professional ski patrol at Alta, Utah and a member of the UCLA ski team.

A keen sea kayaker, he designed two commercially built sea kayaks, the Inuit Classic and the Inuit Explorer.  He is a past president of the New South Wales Sea Kayak Club.

Sanders currently lives near Byron Bay, New South Wales, where he conducts charter flights in self-launching gliders. He is married to animal rights activist and journalist Sue Arnold, and has one daughter, Cristina, and two grandchildren who presently live in San Francisco.

References

External links
 Biography at Australian Parliament website
 

1932 births
Living people
Australian Democrats members of the Parliament of Australia
Members of the Australian Senate for Tasmania
Members of the Tasmanian House of Assembly
Politicians from Cleveland
University of California, Los Angeles alumni
University of Tasmania alumni
Australian mountain climbers
American emigrants to Australia
Australian environmentalists
20th-century Australian politicians
Tasmanian Wilderness Society
Fulbright alumni
University of Alaska alumni
Academic staff of the Australian National University